Winfred Rolker (March 14, 1892 – June 7, 1978) was an American racewalker. He competed in the 3 km walk and the 10 km walk events at the 1920 Summer Olympics.

References

1892 births
1978 deaths
Sportspeople from Brooklyn
Track and field athletes from New York City
American male racewalkers
Olympic track and field athletes of the United States
Athletes (track and field) at the 1920 Summer Olympics